The Atlantic City Express Service (ACES) was an inter-city train service offered by the Borgata, Caesars Atlantic City, and Harrah's Atlantic City, operating from February 2009 until September 2011. It was operated by New Jersey Transit under contract, and funded by the Casino Reinvestment Development Authority. The train provided summer seasonal service between New York City and Atlantic City three days a week, operating along the Northeast Corridor and Atlantic City Line. The train was formally discontinued on March 9, 2012.

Background
With the success of NJT's commuter service to Atlantic City, talks about direct service to New York were discussed. In June 2006, the board of New Jersey Transit accepted a plan for an express service between Atlantic City, New Jersey and Pennsylvania Station in Midtown Manhattan, for a three-year trial initially slated to begin in 2007 (Newark Penn was not initially intended as a stop, but it would be added during the planning stages). Because of delays in acquiring the cars and preparing the needed motive power (the 8 cars for this service are part of a larger 329-car order, and the four diesel locomotives were acquired from Amtrak), the service did not begin until February 2009.

The fleet was composed of eight bilevel rail cars carrying both ACES and NJ Transit markings, with service funded by the Casino Reinvestment Development Authority and three casinos, Caesars, Harrah's, and the Borgata. Each train contained 300 seats with 4 cars per train. The multi-level cars' interior was customized for the ACES service, adding first class seating sections and lounge facilities. The cars were dedicated to ACES service and were never used for regular passenger service by NJ Transit.

In January 2011, service was suspended until May, citing low ridership and a $6 million loss in the first year of operations. Service resumed May 13, 2011 and ended September 18, 2011. The formal discontinuation of the route was announced on March 9, 2012.

The ACES passenger cars were converted to regular NJT cars by Bombardier from 2013 until 2014. They re-entered NJT service in mid-2014.
The dual-powered locomotives are used to provide service from the Raritan Valley Line into New York City Penn Station.

ACES fares
Tickets for the ACES service were priced on a dynamic pricing scale, with tickets varying between $29 and $69 for one-way coach travel, first-class service available for a $20 upgrade from the coach fare, and lounge rental available for a $200 to $300 upgrade from the coach fare.

Route
Trains picked up passengers at New York Penn Station and Newark Penn Station, then ran non-stop to/from the Atlantic City Rail Terminal in about two-and-a-half to three hours.

Trains departed New York pushed by an ALP-44 electric locomotive and led by a dormant GE P40DC diesel locomotive until Frankford Junction in North Philadelphia. At this junction in North Philadelphia, the train reversed direction and was pushed by the P40DC along the Atlantic City Line. Northbound, the P40DC pulled the train to Frankford Junction, and then the ALP-44 pulled the train up the Northeast Corridor to New York. Sometimes, trains would switch between electric and diesel power at Newark, depending on operational conditions.

Station listing
ACES trains made the following station stops:

See also
 Atlantic City Express (Amtrak)
 Blue Comet
 Pennsylvania–Reading Seashore Lines
 CapeFlyer
 Cannonball (LIRR train)

References

NJ Transit Rail Operations
Harrah's Entertainment
MGM Resorts International
Boyd Gaming
Passenger rail transportation in New Jersey
Railway services introduced in 2009
Railway services discontinued in 2012
2009 establishments in New Jersey
2012 disestablishments in New Jersey